Marc Kenny (born 17 September 1973) is an Irish former footballer.

Kenny was captain of the Home Farm schoolboys team that got into the Guinness Book of Records for going six seasons without a defeat.

A Republic of Ireland national under-17 football team international after three seasons at Liverpool he came home to play three seasons in the IFA Premiership with Bangor F.C. and Glenavon F.C.

He made his League of Ireland debut for Shamrock Rovers at Finn Harps on 12 October 1996.

A week later he scored on his full debut against Bohs in a 3-2 victory in Tolka Park.

He scored a memorable free kick against Glasgow Celtic in July 1998.

Kenny left Rovers before the 2005 League of Ireland season.

His last League of Ireland game was at Tolka Park in November 2005 as Rovers were relegated for the first time in their history.

A tremendous free kick taker, Marc's connections to Rovers went back much further as older brother Harry Kenny spent 13 seasons at the club.

He now works as a Football In Community Development Officer for the Football Association of Ireland and coaches Phoenix F.C. in the Leinster Senior League (soccer).

Kenny played in the 1990 UEFA European Under-16 Football Championship qualifiers and the 1992 UEFA European Under-18 Football Championship qualifiers.

European football

His first European game was for Bangor F.C. against APOEL in the 1993-94 European Cup Winners' Cup. His free kick led to Bangor's opener. In the second leg his corner led to Mark Glendinning's finish in Cyprus.

He was the only Glenavon player carded in the clash at Werder Bremen in the 1995-96 UEFA Cup.

For Rovers his free kick led to Derek Tracey's goal at Altayspor in the 1998 UEFA Intertoto Cup. In the home leg he was sent off.

Honours

 Ulster Cup
 Bangor F.C. 1994/95
 County Antrim Shield
 Glenavon F.C. 1995/96
Leinster Senior Cup (football)
 Shamrock Rovers 1997
 FAI Super Cup
 Shamrock Rovers 1998

References

Republic of Ireland association footballers
Republic of Ireland youth international footballers
Shamrock Rovers F.C. players
Glenavon F.C. players
Bangor F.C. players
Kildare County F.C. players
League of Ireland players
NIFL Premiership players
Association footballers from Dublin (city)
1973 births
Living people
Association football midfielders
Home Farm F.C. players